Wang Yongxin (Chinese: 王永鑫; born 16 January 1990 in Zhengzhou) is a Chinese football player who currently plays for China League One side Nantong Zhiyun.

Club career
In 2011, Wang started his professional footballer career with Chengdu Blades in the Chinese Super League. On 11 June 2011, he made his debut for Chengdu in the 2011 Chinese Super League against Liaoning Whowin, coming on as a substitute for Zhang Li in the 74th minute.
On 27 February 2014, Wang transferred to China League One side Hunan Billows.

In March 2016, Wang signed for China League Two side Nantong Zhiyun. He would go on to gain promotion to the second tier when the club finished runners-up at the end of the 2018 China League Two campaign.

Career statistics 
Statistics accurate as of match played 31 December 2020.

References

External links
 

1990 births
Living people
Chinese footballers
People from Zhengzhou
Footballers from Henan
Chengdu Tiancheng F.C. players
Hunan Billows players
Nantong Zhiyun F.C. players
Chinese Super League players
China League One players
China League Two players
Association football defenders